The Djabugay people (also known as Djabuganydji or Tjapukai)  are a group of Australian Aboriginal people who are the original inhabitants of mountains, gorges, lands and waters of a richly forested part of the Great Dividing Range including the Barron Gorge and surrounding areas within the Wet Tropics of Queensland.

Language
Djabugay belongs to the Yidinic branch of the Pama–Nyungan language family, and is closely related to Yidin. It shares the distinction, with Bandjalang in north-eastern New South Wales and South East Queensland, and Maung spoken on the Goulburn Islands off the coast of Arnhem Land, of being one of only three languages that lack the dual form. The last speaker with a good knowledge of the language was Gilpin Banning.

Country
Norman Tindale described the territory of the Tjapukai (Djabugay)  as extending along the plateau south of and to the east of south of Mareeba, from Barron River, south of Mareeba to Kuranda and north toward Port Douglas. Their western boundary was defined by the margin of the rain forest from Tolga north to Mount Molloy. By 1952, the Djabugay claimed also the coastal strip between Cairns Inlet and Lamb Range, with one horde lived near Redlynch, Cairns.

Mythology

The Djabugay word for their ancestral times, beyond their living memory, (also known as 'Story time' or 'Dreamtime') is bulurru being a time when, for instance, it is told the Rainbow Serpent Gudju Gudju, in the form of a giant carpet snake (aka Budadji) traveled through the country, bartering with families along the way exchanging coastal nautilus shells for rainforest products such as dilly bags, his body creating within the landscape everything from Yaln giri (Crystal Cascades) to Ngunbay (Kuranda), moving through the Mowbray River to the hill at Port Douglas, finally coming to rest at Wangal Djungay (Double Island) In one account, he was killed by emu men at 'Din din ( the Barron Falls), an incident which unleashed the powerful monsoonal rains on the region. There were also 2 Bulurru dreamtime brothers, Damarri and Guyala, who laid down the contours, created the plant foods, established the customary law and the system of clan marriage by moieties. The contours of the Barron River and Redlynch Valley, for example, are thought of as representing the supine body of Damarri.

The tale of Budadji's travels along the Barron Gorge is included in the web guide of Queensland Rail to the railways journey from Cairns to Kuranda.

History
European settlers explored and cleared the land for gold and tin. "Dispersals", the euphemism for shooting groups of blacks, were undertaken at Smithfield (1878), at Biboohra near the Clohesy River close to Kuranda in the early 1880s, and also near Mareeba in 1881.

In May 1886, a railway was constructed from Cairns to Herberton with part of the rails going on top of a walking track. The Djabugay were unhappy about this development and withstood the settlement by spearing bullocks and settlers. As the settlers entered, traditional hunting and gathering grounds were taken over.

This led to the notorious Speewah massacre in 1890 where John Atherton took revenge on the Djubagay by sending in native troopers to avenge the killing of a bullock. The Djubagay were segregated from them and forced to live at the Mona-Mona Mission and were unable to hunt, fish or move around. Their numbers fell dramatically at the turn of the century.

By 1896, the region supported coffee plantations and the Djabugay were used as labour on farms.

Many now own their own land, some other settlements and farms in the area.

On 17 December 2004, it was recognised that native title existed in the Barron Gorge National Park for the Djabugay..

Native title
All Djabugay peoples share, in common, descent from ancestors who (a) have been given personal names that are sourced from, spoken in, and almost exclusively belong to the Djabugay languages (or dialects) and who (b) have transmitted, from generation to generation, Djabugay language (or dialects), Djabugay knowledge, Djabugay tradition, Djabugay heritage, plus Djabugay law.

In 2004, Justice Jeffrey Spender, a Federal Court judge, in analyzing Djabugay land claims in terms of Australian legislation regarding native title, touched on the concept of bulurru and affirmed that for them the geomorphic features of the area affirm the truth of the laws instituted by the dreamtime, and are taken as tangible proof of bulurru and the totemic beings in Djabugay country. It followed that the physical landscape, its "storyplaces" and "storywaters" in bulurru tradition underline the 'inalienable connection between the native claimants, their ancestral beings and the land.

In land title claims, there was a long running dispute between the Djabugay and the Yirrganydji the latter claiming native title to the area from Cairns to Port Douglas. The clash arose out of the siting of the Tjapukai Aboriginal Cultural Park. Though some Djabuguy wished their claim to be included under the general claim, regarding them as part of the Dajabugay people, the Yirrganydji insisted on maintaining their separate identity. Eventually the two corporations representing the groups came to a compromise agreement.

Notable people
 David Hudson

Notes

Citations

Sources

External links
 Djabugay community website
 Djabugay Indigenous Land Use Agreement for Barron Gorge National Park
 Indigenous Community in Kuranda
 QPWS website Barron Gorge National Park – Nature, culture and history
 

Aboriginal peoples of Queensland
Far North Queensland